Pauline Alethea Brailsford (born 7 December 1928) is an English retired actress and director.

Her best-known film performance was A League of Their Own as the team's chaperone Miss Cuthburt, for which she shared a 1993 MTV Movie Award nomination with Tom Hanks for Best Kiss. She taught theatre studies at Columbia College in Chicago and was the artistic director of the Body Politic theatre company in Chicago in the 1980s and early 1990s.

Filmography
 Chicago Story (1981, TV)
 Vital Signs (1986, TV)
 Under the Biltmore Clock (TV, 1986)
 Big Shots (1987)
 A League of Their Own (1992)
 Murder, She Wrote (1 episode, 1993)
 Coach (1 episode, 1994)
 To Sir, with Love II (TV series, 1 episode, 1996)

References

External links

1928 births
Living people
English expatriates in the United States
English film actresses
English television actresses
Columbia College Chicago faculty
Drama teachers
People from Ecclesall
Actresses from Sheffield